Sinaloa is a state of Mexico.

Sinaloa may also refer to:

Places
 Sinaloa de Leyva, a town in Sinaloa
 Sinaloa Lake, a reservoir in Simi Valley, California
 Sinaloa Municipality, a municipality in Sinaloa
 Sinaloa River, a river of Mexico

Music
 El Chapo de Sinaloa, a Mexican musician
 El Potro de Sinaloa, a Mexican musician
 Los Cuates de Sinaloa, a Mexican band

Sports clubs
 Dorados de Sinaloa, a Mexican professional football club

Birds
 Sinaloa crow, a species of bird in the family Corvidae
 Sinaloa martin, a species of bird in the family Hirundinidae
 Sinaloa wren, a species of bird in the family Troglodytidae

Other uses
 Sinaloa Cartel, a drug-trafficking and organized crime group based in Sinaloa
 Operation Sinaloa, an anti-drug trafficking operation in Sinaloa

Spanish-language surnames